CLPP may refer to:
 CLP protease family, a family of proteolytic enzymes
 Endopeptidase Clp, an enzyme complex
 ATP-dependent Clp protease proteolytic subunit, a catalytic subunit of the Clp complex (encoded by the CLPP gene in humans)
 Local Public Planning Council, a system of local government in Venezuela